Touch is the second full-length album by Canadian indie rock band July Talk, released September 9, 2016 on Sleepless Records. The album won the Juno Award for Alternative Album of the Year at the Juno Awards of 2017.

Tanya Tagaq appears as a guest vocalist on the album, on the track "Beck + Call".

Critical reception
Sandra Sperounes of the Edmonton Journal described the album as "a thrusting, sweaty, and intimate look at lust, loneliness, obsession, and privacy in a world dominated by cellphones, computers, and consumption." Matt Williams commented in Now that "July Talk's sophomore record bristles with the electricity of connection - between singers Leah Fay and Peter Dreimanis and the characters inside the songs."

Track listing

Certifications

References 

2016 albums
July Talk albums
Juno Award for Alternative Album of the Year albums